Trachythyone is a genus of sea cucumbers in the family Cucumariidae.

Species
The following species are recognised in the genus Trachythyone:
Trachythyone candida O'Loughlin & O'Hara, 1992
Trachythyone crassipeda Cherbonnier, 1961
Trachythyone flaccida Thandar, 2013
Trachythyone glaberrima (Semper, 1869)
Trachythyone glebosa O'Loughlin & O'Hara, 1992
Trachythyone lechleri (Lampert, 1885)
Trachythyone macphersonae Pawson, 1962
Trachythyone maxima Massin, 1992
Trachythyone muricata Studer, 1876
Trachythyone nina (Deichmann, 1930)
Trachythyone peruana (Semper, 1868)

References

Cucumariidae
Holothuroidea genera